Last Leap is a 1970 French crime film directed by Édouard Luntz. It was entered into the 1970 Cannes Film Festival.

Cast
 Maurice Ronet - Garal
 Michel Bouquet - Jauran
 Cathy Rosier - Florence
 Eric Penet - Peras
 André Rouyer - Salvade
 Michel Garland - L'avocat
 Sady Rebbot - Le professeur
 Betty Beckers - La préposée
 Douchka - La serveuse
 Catherine Arditi - Christiane Dancour
 Albertine Bui - Tai
 Michel Charrel - Le patron du café
 Pierre Arditi

References

External links

1970 films
1970 crime films
1970s French-language films
French crime films
Films directed by Édouard Luntz
1970s French films